The Graduate School Graubünden was a not-for-profit corporation based in Davos, Switzerland, with the purpose of supporting scientific staff in the canton of Graubünden by offering training courses, networking and by communicating widely about the research of the scientific community of Graubünden. The Graduate School Graubünden had been founded in December 2014 by Academia Raetica. It worked on the basis of a performance mandate by the canton. 
As of January 2021 Graduate School Graubünden was integrated back into Academia Raetica, ensuring a seamless transition of all services into the responsibility of Academia Raetica.

External links 
Homepage Academia Raetica (http://www.academiaraetica.ch)

Davos
Non-profit organisations based in Switzerland
Organizations established in 2014